Traditional Ukrainian Christmas festivities start on Christmas Eve, which is celebrated on .

Christmas was largely erased from the Ukrainian calendar for much of the 20th century due to the Soviet Union's anti-religious policies, but many of its traditions survived, having been transplanted to New Year's Day.

History

In Ukraine, the Christmas holiday became the official celebration with the baptism of Rus' ordered by Prince Vladimir in the late 10th century. However, given the early Christian community of Kievan Rus', the celebration may have a longer history.

In the 19th century, a lavishly decorated Christmas tree became central to the holiday, a tradition originally imported by Nicholas I's wife, Alexandra Feodorovna, from her native Prussia. The tradition of giving gifts to children on Christmas took root around the same time. Christmas gifts were traditionally brought by Did Moroz or Grandfather Frost, the Ukrainian counterpart of Saint Nicholas or Father Christmas, albeit a little taller and less stout. Rooted in Slavic folklore, Ded Moroz is accompanied by his beautiful granddaughter, Snegurka (The Snowmaiden), who rides with him on a sleigh pulled by a trio of horses.

During the early Soviet period, all religious celebrations were discouraged under the official state policy of atheism. The Bolsheviks argued that Christmas was a pagan sun-worshipping ritual with no basis in scientific fact and denounced the Christmas tree as a bourgeois German import. In 1929, all religious holidays, including Christmas, were abolished by a decree of the Stalinist regime. However, in a surprising turn of state politics in 1935, many Ukrainian Christmas traditions were revived as part of a secular New Year's celebration after Joseph Stalin's advisers convinced the Vozhd of the proletarians' need for a break from their hard work in the middle of a long, cold winter. The Christmas tree was repurposed as a "New Year's fir tree" to be admired by all children throughout the Soviet Union, including those in republics that had not historically celebrated Christmas due to their different religious traditions, such as the Central Asian ones. Other Ukrainian Christmas attributes and traditions, such as gift-giving, Did Moroz's visits and Christmas decorations, lost their religious significance and became associated with New Year's celebrations, which were secular in nature.

In 1991, after the dissolution of the Soviet Union, Christmas was reinstated alongside other religious holidays. 
Especially in recent years, there has been a shift from Did Moroz, who came to be associated with the Soviet-era heritage, to the more traditional Saint Nicholas, who used to be more popular in Western Ukraine. There were rumors that Ded Moroz imagery was discouraged by the authorities due to conflict with Russia; however, the Ukrainian Ministry of Culture has refuted this.

Date of celebration 

As of 2017, 25 December, Christmas Day by the Gregorian calendar, became an official government holiday in Ukraine. The Eastern Orthodox Churches predominantly follow the Julian calendar, and 7 January is also a public holiday in Ukraine. In December 2020, the head of the Orthodox Church of Ukraine, Metropolitan Epiphanius, said that changing the date of Christmas to 25 December in Ukraine is possible after both the church and the faithful are ready for such a decision, after conducting educational work. It was stated that the postponement of the Nativity of the Lord would entail a change in the dates of all fixed holidays to 13 days ago. In December 2020, the head of the Ukrainian Greek Catholic Church (UGCC), Patriarch Sviatoslav, stated that the Greek Catholic Church would resolve this issue "together with our Orthodox brothers." He also noted that this issue is not dogmatic, it should overcome church divisions, not cause new ones, and in his opinion, the transition to celebrating Christmas in a new style — 25 December, should be initiated by the laity.

On 18 October 2022, the Orthodox Church of Ukraine allowed dioceses to hold Christmas services according to the Revised Julian calendar, i.e., 25 December. In the case of a divine service, its participants are released from the restrictions of fasting on this day.

The primates decided to create a joint working group on specific proposals for calendar reform. The joint group is initiated on the occasion of the celebration of the 1700th anniversary of the First Ecumenical Council, held in Nicaea in 325. In this Council, in particular, the calendar principles of church life were determined.

In February 2023 the UGCC decided to switch to a new style (Revised Julian calendar) for fixed holidays from September 2023.

Sviatyi Vechir (Holy Evening)
Christmas Eve is called Sviatyi Vechir (Святий вечір) or Sviatvechir (Святвечір) in Ukraine ("Holy Evening"), and has many customs and rituals, most of which predate the introduction of Christianity to Ukraine. Traditions include decorating house and dinner table with special attributes (a symbolic sheaf of wheat called the didukh, garlic, hay, and others), performing koliadky ('carols') and so on.  Each ritual has its own meaning and purpose, as such a few wisps of hay on the embroidered tablecloth as a reminder of the manger in Bethlehem. One prominent custom of the night is a special supper, called Sviata Vecheria ("Holy Supper").

Ukrainians fast on Sviat vechir; only when the first star is seen in the evening sky, may the supper begin.  The family comes together to have a dinner which usually includes 12 dishes (the number can vary from 7–17). These twelve dishes are traditionally vegan plus fish, and do not contain meat, milk, or eggs. While the dishes served can vary regionally, as well as from family to family, the two mandatory dishes are uzvar and kutia, both reckoned by ethnographer Khvedir Vovk to be remnants of ancient rituals which date back to the neolithic era. Kutia (a dish of grain, honey and poppy seeds) is traditionally served first at the meal, after being offered by the head of the household to the frost. A spoonful is tossed at the ceiling, and the number of poppy seeds which stick portends the fruitfulness of the fields and farm animals in the coming year. It is rarely served at other times of the year. Uzvar is a beverage, made with cooked dried fruits and berries. It can be mixed in with the kutia, or served separately at the end of the meal.  Servings of both dishes are also set aside overnight in the pokuttia, the corner of the house with the icons, for the ancestors.

Koliadky (Caroling)
At the end of the Sviata Vechera the family often sings carols (koliadky, singular koliadka). In many communities the ancient Ukrainian tradition of caroling is carried on by groups of young people and members of organizations and churches calling at homes and collecting donations.

Didukh (Grandfather)
In villages (farming communities), the head of the household brings in a sheaf of grain called the didukh which represents the importance of the ancient and rich wheat crops of Ukraine, the staff of life through the centuries. Didukh means literally "grandfather spirit" so it symbolizes the family's ancestors. In Ukrainian city homes the didukh may be purchased, and is often three footed made of woven grain and dried grasses and flowers.

Shopka (Nativity scene)
A shopka (vertep) is a traditional portable nativity scene used to represent nativity and other figures in a puppet form.

Gallery

Further reading 

 Kutia, Star of the Ukrainian Christmas Eve Supper
Kylymnyk, Stepan, 1955–1969; Ukrainskyi Rik u Narodnykh Zvychayakh v Narodnomu Osvitlenni [Ukrainian Year in Folk Customs from Historical Perspective], Winnipeg, Toronto
Tracz, Orysia 2015, First Star I See Tonight, Mazepa Publications Zhuravli, Winnipeg
Ukrainian Christmas Traditions, Ukrainian International Directory
Voropai, Oleksa 1958, Zvychai Nashoho Narodu [Customs of Our People], Ukrainske Vydavnytstvo, Munich
Yakovenko, Svitlana 2016, Ukrainian Christmas Eve Supper: Traditional village recipes for Sviata Vecheria, Sova Books, Sydney

See also
 Old New Year
 
 Koliadka

References

 
Ukrainian culture
Ukraine
Ukrainian traditions
Public holidays in Ukraine
January observances
Ukraine
Christianity in Ukraine
Winter events in Ukraine
Eastern Orthodox liturgical days